is a Japanese Olympic eventing rider. He participated at the 2016 Summer Olympics in Rio de Janeiro where he withdrew during the individual competition.

Kitajima also competed at the 2014 Asian Games. He won a silver medal in the team eventing and placed 6th individually.

References

External links
 Profile on Japan Equesterian Federation (in Japanese)

Living people
1985 births
Japanese male equestrians
Equestrians at the 2016 Summer Olympics
Olympic equestrians of Japan
Equestrians at the 2014 Asian Games
Equestrians at the 2018 Asian Games
Asian Games gold medalists for Japan
Asian Games silver medalists for Japan
Asian Games medalists in equestrian
Medalists at the 2014 Asian Games
Medalists at the 2018 Asian Games
Equestrians at the 2020 Summer Olympics